The Laban ng Makabayang Masang Pilipino was the umbrella political coalition party of the opposition during the May 11, 1998 Philippine general election that led to the presidency of then-Vice President Joseph E. Estrada. It was the largest political party during that time, uniting the major Philippine political parties which included Senator Edgardo J. Angara's Laban ng Demokratikong Pilipino, business tycoon Eduardo M. Cojuangco Jr.'s Nationalist People's Coalition and Vice President Joseph E. Estrada's Partido ng Masang Pilipino, along with minor and regional parties. Estrada's running mate, Senator Edgardo Angara lost to fellow Senator Gloria Macapagal Arroyo of Lakas—NUCD—UMDP. Estrada won the presidency against then-Speaker of the House Jose C. de Venecia Jr. with a plurality margin of 6.4 million votes. 

Shortly after the 1998 elections, the party's name was changed into Lapian ng Masang Pilipino (Organization of the Filipino Masses), as the "struggle" ended with Estrada's victory.

Slogan
The coalition devised an acronym for the Senate slate which is: TPW (The Pilipino Win/The Philippine Way), JOBS and LABOR. T stands for Torres; P for Pimentel; W for Webb; J for Jaworski; O for Ople; B for Bagatsing; S for Sotto; L for Lagman; A for Aquino-Oreta; B for Biazon; O for Osmeña; R for Romero.

Senatorial slate
Below is the official senatorial slate of LAMMP for the 1998 Philippine senatorial election.

Election results
The success of the coalition was partly because of the popularity of its presidential bet, Vice President Estrada who won the presidential election. His senatorial slate also gained majority of 7 out of 12 available seats in the Senate. The following were the LAMMP senatorial bets who won:

 Tito Sotto 
 Nene Pimentel
 Rodolfo Biazon
 Blas Ople
 John Henry Osmeña
 Robert Jaworski
 Tessie Aquino-Oreta

The coalition also gained great majority in the House of Representatives and majority of elected local officials who ran as members of the coalition.
 
LAMMP was abolished during the 2001 midterm legislative elections and was replaced by a new coalition of pro-Estrada legislators led by Angara's LDP, named Puwersa ng Masa (Force of the Masses) which was led by Estrada's wife, Luisa Pimentel-Ejercito.

References

Defunct political party alliances in the Philippines
Political parties established in 1997
Political parties disestablished in 2001